Jiang Shenglong (born 24 December 2000) is a Chinese professional footballer who currently plays for Chinese Super League club Shanghai Shenhua.

Club career
Jiang Shenglong joined Chinese Super League side Shanghai Shenhua's youth academy in March 2018 when Shenhua bought Genbao Football Base's U19 teams. He was promoted to the first team squad in the summer break of 2018. On 22 July 2018, Jiang made his senior debut in a 2–2 away draw against Henan Jianye, replacing Rong Hao in the 77th minute.

International career
On 20 July 2022, Jiang made his international debut in a 3-0 defeat against South Korea in the 2022 EAFF E-1 Football Championship, as the Chinese FA decided to field the U-23 national team for this senior competition.

Career statistics

Honours

Club
Shanghai Shenhua
Chinese FA Cup: 2019

International goals

China U23

References

External links
 

2000 births
Living people
Chinese footballers
Footballers from Jiangsu
Sportspeople from Nanjing
Shanghai Shenhua F.C. players
Tianjin Jinmen Tiger F.C. players
Chongqing Liangjiang Athletic F.C. players
Chinese Super League players
Association football midfielders
China under-20 international footballers